Clearwater High School (CHS) is a four-year public high school located in Clearwater, Florida, United States. It is part of the Pinellas County School System. The school mascot is a tornado, therefore students and faculty are know as the Tornadoes. Their colors are crimson and gray, which is also the name of their fight song.

History
Clearwater High School traces its lineage to 1906, when three 9th-graders were enrolled at a small schoolhouse built that year on Ft. Harrison Avenue. In 1924, Clearwater High School was built on Greenwood Avenue, where it remained until the current campus on Hercules Avenue was completed in 1954. In 1999, a $12-million renovation of the facilities was completed.

Academics
Clearwater High has various academic programs, also known as Academies, centering on different aspects of life beyond high school, as well as an optional University of Cambridge AICE Diploma program alongside them. In 2017, The Washington Post ranked it as the "most challenging high school" in Pinellas County, based on the number of Advanced Placement and International Baccalaureate students as a percentage of graduating seniors. The school offered 18 AP courses that year, while attaining an 88% graduation rate, with 73% of graduates going on to attend a four-year college.

Athletics

The school's 4,200-seat football stadium was built in 1950 and dedicated in 1951 as Central Pinellas Stadium. It 1963, it was renamed to honor Jack White, a judge on the Florida Second District Court of Appeal, who was a leading figure in the effort beginning in 1949 to build the stadium.

In addition to football, other boys' sports include baseball, swimming, and wrestling. The Clearwater Tornadoes compete in a variety of sports for both boys and girls, including basketball, soccer, golf, track and field, lacrosse, and tennis. Under head coach Jack Wilson, the Tornadoes won the boys' basketball state championship in 1981. The school's Jack L. Wilson Gymnasium is named in his memory.

The school has also won state championships in the following sports:
Boys Golf (1968)
Girls Cross Country (1976)
Girls Track (1977)
Swimming (1978)
Volleyball (1997 and 2000)
Boys Soccer, Class 3A (2001)

Notable alumni
 Sara Blakely (class of 1989), founder and owner of Spanx, American Inventor Judge in 2007, Ernst and Young Entrepreneur of the Year Winner in 2002.
 Mike Brittain (class of 1981), former NBA center for the San Antonio Spurs.
 Gene Chizik (class of 1980), former head football coach at Auburn University.
 Jeremiah George (class of 2010), current NFL linebacker for the Indianapolis Colts.
 Howard Johnson (class of 1978), former MLB third baseman for the New York Mets.
 Hassan Jones (class of 1982), former NFL wide receiver for the Minnesota Vikings.
Robert Margalis (class of 2000), Olympic Swimmer
 Bruce Melnick (class of 1967), NASA astronaut.
 Scott Nicolas (class of 1978), former NFL linebacker for the Cleveland Browns.
 Joel Parker (class of 1970), former NFL wide receiver for the New Orleans Saints.
 Nicole Passanno Stott (class of 1980), NASA astronaut.
 Jordan Wall (class of 2003), American television and film actor.
 Okaro White (class of 2010), NBA power forward for the Miami Heat.
 Rebecca Goodgame Ebinger (class of 1993), United States District Judge of the United States District Court for the Southern District of Iowa and former Iowa state Judge.

References

External links

High schools in Pinellas County, Florida
Public high schools in Florida
Educational institutions established in 1906
1906 establishments in Florida